San Isidro is a district of the El Guarco canton, in the Cartago province of Costa Rica.

Geography 
San Isidro has an area of  km2 and an elevation of  metres.

Locations 
 Barrios (neighborhoods): Guatuso, Higuito, Potrerillos
 Poblados (villages): Altamiradas, Alto San Francisco, Bajo Gloria, Bajos de León, Barrancas (part), Cangreja, Cañón (part), Casablanca, Casamata, Cascajal, Conventillo, Cruces, Cruz, Chonta (part), Damita, Dos Amigos, Empalme (part), Esperanza, Estrella, Guayabal (part), La Luchita, La Paz, Macho Gaff, Montserrat, Ojo de Agua (part), Palmital, Palmital Sur, Palo Verde, Paso Macho (part), Purires (part), Salsipuedes (part), San Cayetano, Surtubal, Tres de Junio, Vara del Roble

Demographics 

For the 2011 census, San Isidro had a population of  inhabitants.

Transportation

Road transportation 
The district is covered by the following road routes:
 National Route 2
 National Route 222
 National Route 226
 National Route 315
 National Route 406

References 

Districts of Cartago Province
Populated places in Cartago Province